Estofado is an artistic technique that imitates the appearance of gold brocade. The term comes from the Italian "stoffa" (fabric) in reference to the fine textiles it seeks to reproduce. Its origin is found in the Gothic period, its use became more popular during the renaissance and baroque periods, particularly in Spain and its cultural sphere of influence, where it became prevalent. While estofado is mostly used for wooden sculpture, either statuary in the round or reliefs, it is can also be used on other mediums, such as stone sculptures or panel paintings.

In 1777 the "Real Academia de Bellas Artes de San Fernando" assumes the authority to approve all designs for new altarpieces, and according to the new Neoclassical tastes, required that polychrome woulld should be replaced with "marble or other suitable stones". This shift in style caused the technique to be relegated to a secondary level, and was seen as common or popular by the cultured society.

Gallery

References
 Roman, Rolf, Baroque: Architecture, Sculpture, Painting, 2007
 Explanation of the "Estofado" technique on the Getty Museum website
 Definition from glosarioarquitectonico.com
 Definition of Estofado by Merriam-Webster

Artistic techniques
Gold
Metal plating